Scelsi Morning is a 2003 album by Marc Ribot released on Tzadik Records.

Reception
The Allmusic review by Sean Westergaard states, "Taken as a whole, Scelsi Morning is not really an easy listen (although a couple of the tracks are wonderful), but it certainly is impressive".

Track listing
All compositions by Marc Ribot.
 "Bataille" – 4:56
 "Scelsi Morning" - 6:25
 "And Then She Fell..." – 1:26
 "Earth" – 4:01
 "Pennies from Hell" – 4:59
 "Geese" – 12:14
 "Our Daily Bread" – 3:27
 "Identity I-Shmentity" – 6:47
 "The Youth Brigade Triumphs Again (And Again)" – 5:14
 "Kabukitsch" – 3:23

 Tracks 1–3, 5, and 6 were recorded at Sorcerer Sound, New York City in April 2000.
 Track 4 was recorded at Sperry Sound, New York City in April 2000.
 Tracks 7–10 were recorded at Sorcerer Sound, New York City in January 2000.

Personnel
Marc Ribot – guitar
Christine Bard (1, 7–10) – percussion, drums
Roberto Rodriguez (1, 4) – percussion, drums
Ned Rothenberg (1, 2, 5, 6) – bass clarinet, clarinet
Jill Jaffe (1, 2, 6) – violin, viola
Chris Wood (1, 2, 5) – bass
Anthony Coleman (1, 5, 7–10) – pump organ, piano, sampler, trombone
Ted Reichman (2, 6) – pump organ, accordion
Eddie Sperry (4) – sampler
Rob Thomas (7–10) – violin, bass

References

2003 albums
Tzadik Records albums
Marc Ribot albums